Superspade may refer to following:

Superspade, a term sometimes used to describe African Americans
 Superspade, a band featured in the 2008 film Hitte/Harara
Super Spade, a Haight & Asbury identity featured in the 60's counter culture film You Are What You Eat
 Super Spade, a composer who scored the music for the 2008 film Welfare Checks